Lopé National Park is a national park in central Gabon. Bordered by the Ogooué River to the north and the Chaillu Massif to the south, the park takes up roughly 4912 square kilometers. Although the terrain is mostly monsoon forest, in the north the park contains the last remnants of grass savannas created in Central Africa during the last ice age, 15,000 years ago. It was the first protected area in Gabon when the Lopé-Okanda Wildlife Reserve was created in 1946, and in 2007, the national park and surrounding Lopé-Okanda landscape were added to the World Heritage List by UNESCO because of its biodiversity, unique savanna-forest transitional zone, and the spectacular petroglyphs in the region.

Ecology
Lopé National Park has dry weather compared to the rest of Gabon, being located in the rain shadow of the Chaillu Massif. In addition, there a low band of rainfall along the Ogooué River. As a result, the landscape contains a complex mosaic of dense tropical rainforests and savannas. The boundary (called an ecotone) between the two habitats has shifted since the last ice age, with the rainforest expanding into the savanna, although the dry climate has allowed the savanna ecosystem to persist in the north of the park.

Because of the complex environment, the national park contains unusually high biodiversity across many taxa. Over 1,550 plant species have been recorded to date, with many regions of the park yet to be explored fully. In a survey of land snails in the park, 74 species were found from 12 different families. The park also provides critical habitat for the leopard, protecting healthy populations of its prey species including the red river hog, African forest buffalo, and cane rat. Other mammal species found in the part include the endangered giant pangolin and tree pangolin, often sharing nests with Microchiroptera bat species.

Human History
Lopé National Park and its surroundings contain evidence of almost continual human occupation over the last 400,000 years. The Ogooué River Valley is much less forested than its surroundings, making an open landscape that may have been used as a corridor and migration route from the coast to the interior of Africa. The oldest Stone Age tools currently known were discovered at Elarmékora in the central region of the valley, in addition to several other Stone Age archeological sites.
 In the Neolithic, between 3500 and 2000 years ago, the Bantu people may have used the valley during the Bantu expansion, leaving behind remains of polished stone axes and pottery. During that time, small villages were constructed on the hilltops with large rubbish pits. Later, when iron-working appeared in the valley around 2000 years ago, the hilltop villages became larger, with nearby iron furnaces, and agriculture began to flourish. Although over 1600 petroglyphs have been discovered dating from around the time of the beginning of iron-working, it appears that the valley was abandoned sometime between 600 and 1200 AD, before being repopulated by the present-day Okanda people in the 14th and 15th centuries.

Tourism and Conservation
The park contains a small research station, named as Mikongo and run by the Zoological Society London, based in the village known as Mikongo, from which it gets its name. There exists infrastructure to cater for tourists at the base, including several chalets and a large open air dining room, from which the rainforest is a mere five meters away. The park also hosts CEDAMM Training Centre, a Wildlife Conservation Society-run international conservation education center.

Because of global climate change, the dense forest ecosystem is expanding into the savanna ecosystem in the north, leading to the loss of habitat diversity in the park. As a result, annual controlled burns of the savanna have been conducted in the park to reduce the encroachment of the forest vegetation and to provide the required vegetation for the diet of the forest buffalo.

References

External links 

Wildlife Conservation Society
Virtual Tour of the National Parks

World Heritage Sites in Gabon
National parks of Gabon
Protected areas established in 2002
2002 establishments in Gabon
Western Congolian forest–savanna mosaic